Wiski  is a village in the administrative district of Gmina Tuczna, within Biała Podlaska County, Lublin Voivodeship, in eastern Poland.

It is the birthplace of Polish novelist, journalist and translator Edmund Chojecki (1822–1899).

References

Villages in Biała Podlaska County